FC Stavropolye-2009 was a Russian football club based in Stavropol and formally representing the whole Stavropol Krai, founded in 2009. In 2009, it played in the Russian Second Division. It took over the license of FC Dynamo Stavropol, which experienced financial difficulties. For the 2010 season, the club was transformed to a new version of FC Dynamo Stavropol.

External links
Club page at 2liga.ru

References

Association football clubs established in 2009
Association football clubs disestablished in 2010
Defunct football clubs in Russia
Sport in Stavropol
2009 establishments in Russia
2010 disestablishments in Russia